The 1999 Aiwa Cup was a triangular ODI cricket competition held in different venues across Sri Lanka from 22 to 31 August 1999. It featured the national cricket teams of India, Sri Lanka and Australia. The tournament was won by Sri Lanka, who defeated Australia in the final.

Points table

Group stage

1st ODI

2nd ODI

3rd ODI

4th ODI

5th ODI

6th ODI

Final

References

1999 in Indian cricket
1999 in Sri Lankan cricket
1998 in Australian cricket
One Day International cricket competitions
International cricket competitions from 1997–98 to 2000
August 1999 sports events in Asia